Casey Beau Brown (née Reinhardt) (born July 1, 1986) is an American television personality, actress, model, and entrepreneur. Born in Beverly Hills, California, she competed in numerous beauty pageants as a teenager. In 2005, Brown rose to prominence after being cast in the reality television series Laguna Beach: The Real Orange County, which documented the lives of her and her friends as they attended Laguna Beach High School. In 2009, Brown opened the bakery "Casey's Cupcakes" in the historic Mission Inn Hotel & Spa, located in Riverside, California. After winning an episode of the competition series Cupcake Wars in 2011, she opened additional locations throughout the region.

Personal life
Brown was raised in Laguna Beach, California and Dana Point, California by her mother, Kelly Roberts, her late father, John Reinhardt, and step father, Duane Roberts, with her older brother Doug Reinhardt.

She studied Psychology and Pre-Law at Pepperdine University in Malibu, California, and is a member of the Kappa Kappa Gamma sorority.  Brown graduated from Pepperdine University in 2010 with a degree in Psychology.

Casey was engaged to Sean Brown on August 12, 2015, and married him in February 2016. The wedding was attended by the children of OJ Simpson, who are first cousins with Sean Brown, through their late mother Nicole Brown Simpson. They have two children together.  Their daughter, Kensington Kelly, was born in August 2016 and their son, Sean Duane, was born in January 2018.

Business Ventures 
She started her own lip gloss named "Kiss By Casey", marketed on her website, in 2007.

Brown is the owner of Casey's Cupcakes, a boutique cupcake shop with store locations Riverside, California and Laguna Beach, California. She opened the first Casey's Cupcakes in 2009 at the Mission Inn Hotel & Spa in Riverside, California. She won the "Walk of Fame" episode on Food Network's "Cupcake Wars" in 2011 and opened the Laguna Beach store shortly before the episode aired.  Brown has said being on the show "was such a great experience, and really put me and my business on the map."

In November 2020, Brown launched the lifestyle website Luvey.

Pageants
Brown has appeared in numerous beauty pageants.  In 2003, she participated in the Miss California Teen USA, the Miss Orange County Teen USA (in which she was named Miss Congeniality and Miss Laguna Beach Teen USA) and the Hawaiian Tropic Teen Miss 2003 (in which she won Front Cover Girl, Photogenic Award, Personality Plus Award, Most Beautiful Hair Award, Most Beautiful Eyes Award, Best Smile Award, Best Model Award) pageants.  In 2006 she competed in Miss Malibu (in which she won Most Photogenic).

Charity work
In 2002, Brown founded the C.A.S.E.Y. Foundation (Children's Alliance for the Success and Education of Youth in Need), which helps promote the importance of education and the positive effects it has on building success.  Brown speaks to children annually about self-esteem, education, and staying focused on their academics and extracurricular activities.  She has also worked with other charities such as the Orangewood Children's Foundation, Olive Crest Children's Foundation, the Make-a Wish Foundation, the Kelly J. Roberts Private Foundation and the Riverside Humane Society Pet Adoption Center.  In April 2006, she was the Honorary Youth Chair at the Black and White Ball for the Olive Crest Children's Foundation.

Filmography

Film

Television

Commercials/ Music Videos
Fun Facter, LLC commercial
Head Automatica Music Video

References

External links

1986 births
Living people
Participants in American reality television series
American female models
Miss Hawaiian Tropic delegates
21st-century American women